Old Town is a neighborhood in the New York City borough of Staten Island, located on its East Shore. Old Town was established in August 1661 as part of New Netherland, and was the first permanent European settlement on Staten Island. Originally described as "Oude Dorpe" (old village in Dutch), much of its original territory makes up what is present-day South Beach, with parts of Midland Beach and Dongan Hills.  The area was settled by a group of Dutch, Walloon (from what is now southern Belgium and its borders with France) and French Protestants (Huguenots) led by Walloon Pierre Billiou.

Present-day Old Town is typically described as the neighborhood bordered by Grasmere to the north, Dongan Hills to the south, South Beach to the east, and Concord to the west. The neighborhood is served by the Old Town station of the Staten Island Railway. Old Town is also served by the  local buses on Hylan Boulevard and the  local buses on Richmond Road.

Notable places
The neighborhood is home to the campus of Staten Island's largest circulation daily, the Staten Island Advance, a newspaper that likes to refer to Old Town as either Grasmere or Dongan Hills, even though its residents refer to it as Old Town.

The Academy of St. Dorothy, a private Roman Catholic elementary school sits on Hylan Boulevard in Old Town.

Carmel Richmond Healthcare and Rehabilitation Center (formerly Carmel Richmond Nursing Home), a Roman Catholic nursing home sits on Old Town Road. The home was established by the sisters of the Carmelite Order in the 1970s.

A Very Special Place, a school for developmentally disabled children was opened on Quintard Street in the late 1990s.

Notable people
James Oddo, an American politician and member of the New York City Council is a former resident of Old Town.

References

Dickenson, Richard. Holden's Staten Island: The History of Richmond County. Center for Migration Studies, New York. 2002. Pg.17. .

Populated places established in 1661
Neighborhoods in Staten Island
1661 establishments in the Dutch Empire
1661 establishments in North America
Establishments in New Netherland